Mykola Hreshta (born February 25, 1984) is a Ukrainian former footballer.

Playing career 
Hreshta began his career in 2001 with FC Karpaty-2 Lviv in the Ukrainian First League, and with FC Karpaty-3 Lviv in the Ukrainian Second League. In 2003, he made his debut in the Ukrainian Premier League with the senior team FC Karpaty Lviv. In 2005, he returned to the Ukrainian First League to play with FC Skala Stryi. He played with FC Enerhetyk Burshtyn, PFC Nyva Ternopil, FC Halychyna Lviv, FC Rava Rava-Ruska, In 2008, he went abroad to Poland to sign with Spartakus Szarowola in the III liga.

In 2009, he returned to Ukraine to play in the Ukrainian Second League, and Ukrainian Football Amateur League with FC Shakhtar Chervonograd, FC Karpaty Kolomyia, FC Rukh Vynnyky, Karpaty Kamenka-Bug, CCM Demnya, and MKS Wkra Żuromin. In 2016, he played abroad with FC Ukraine United in the Canadian Soccer League. In his second season he assisted FC Ukraine in achieving a perfect season, and winning the Second Division Championship. While in his third year he assisted in securing the First Division title.

References

External links
 

1984 births
Living people
Sportspeople from Lviv
Ukrainian footballers
Ukrainian expatriate footballers
FC Karpaty-2 Lviv players
FC Karpaty-3 Lviv players
FC Karpaty Lviv players
FC Enerhetyk Burshtyn players
FC Nyva Ternopil players
FC Halychyna Lviv players
FC Rava Rava-Ruska players
Stal Stalowa Wola players
FC Rukh Lviv players
FC Ukraine United players
Ukrainian Premier League players
Canadian Soccer League (1998–present) players
Association football defenders
Ukrainian First League players
Expatriate footballers in Poland
III liga players